Eduard Ott-Heinrich Keller (22 June 1906 in Frankfurt (Main), Germany – 5 December 1990 in Halle, Germany) was a German mathematician who worked in the fields of geometry, topology and algebraic geometry. He formulated the celebrated problem which is now called the Jacobian conjecture in 1939.

He was born in Frankfurt–am-Main, and studied at the universities of Frankfurt, Vienna, Berlin and Göttingen. As a student of Max Dehn he wrote a dissertation on the tiling of space with cubes. This led to another 'Keller conjecture': the Keller cube-tiling conjecture from 1930.

Subsequently he worked with Georg Hamel in Berlin, habilitating in 1933 with a thesis on Cremona transformations. The Jacobian conjecture is quite naturally posed in that setting. The motivation for looking at rather general polynomial transformations, say of the projective plane, came from the singularity theory for algebraic curves.

During World War II he taught in a naval college in Flensburg. After the war he had several positions, and was appointed a professor at Martin Luther University of Halle-Wittenberg in 1952, as successor of H. W. E. Jung.

References

Biography (German language)

External links

1906 births
1990 deaths
20th-century German mathematicians
Geometers
Academic staff of the University of Münster